Manchi Manishi is a 1964 Indian Telugu-language drama film, produced by K. Subba Raju under the Chaya Chitra banner and directed by K. Pratyagatma. It stars N. T. Rama Rao, Jamuna and Jaggayya, with music jointly composed by S. Rajeswara Rao and T. Chalapathi Rao.

Plot
Veeraiah a hardworking laborer when his wife under labor, perturbed Veeriah runs for a doctor. At the same time, a thief hits and keeps the stolen ornament in his pocket where is accused. In the court, Public prosecutor Ranganadham sentences by posing himself as a son & grandson of a burglar. Desperate, Veeriah absconds from jail for his wife but unfortunately, she dies in the hospital giving birth to a baby boy. At that moment, Veeraiah notices Ranganadham's wife Shantamma also gives birth to a boy. Now Veeraiah decides to take revenge, so, he exchanges the babies. After that, Veeraiah again caught by Police, leaving the child under the guardianship of his neighbor Suramma. Due to hunger and lack of parental care, the boy becomes a robber. Years roll by, Venu son of Ranganadham becomes a notorious criminal and Veeriah's son Vasu becomes a reputed solicitor. Venu works for a deadly gang and he has the extraordinary talent of opening lockers with empty hands. Ranganadham sister's daughter Susheela grows along with Vasu whom he loves and the elders fix their alliance, but Susheela does not have such intention. Eventually, Veeraiah releases, feel happy knowing his dream come true. Once Venu gets acquainted with Susheela and both of them fall in love, knowing it, Vasu decides to sacrifice his love. But when he realizes Venu as a burglar, immediately, informs Susheela which she is not ready to believe. To keep up her trust, Venu leaves his profession and reforms himself. Once on the occasion of Susheela's birthday, Venu is also invited, when a baby gets stuck in a locker, to protect her Venu uses his talent, by which he is recognized and surrenders himself. Vasu takes up the case as defense counsel argues that Thief's son may not be a Thief when Veeraiah feels proud and Venu is sentenced for 3 months. At this point in time, Susheela understands the virtue of Venu and promises him to wait until his arrival. Time passes, Venu releases, Susheela takes him to their house where Ranganadham tries to bribe him. Venu throws it away and leaves the place. After reaching home, Venu spots Veeraiah on death bed and saves him keeping his life at risk. Here Veeraiah realizes the mistake and confesses the truth, but Venu does not want to reveal as to keep his father's honor. Meanwhile, Ranganadham forcibly makes the marriage arrangements of Vasu and Susheela. During the time of the wedding, Vasu also learns the truth and rushes towards Venu to get back, but he refuses. Simultaneously, Venu's previous gangsters planned to make a robbery at Ranganadham's house. Detecting it, Vasu & Venu breaks out their plan. In that quarrel, Veeraiah gets wounded while protecting Venu and admits his sin. There, Ranganadham also feels sorry for his deeds and accepts Venu as his son. Afterward, Vasu prepares to leave the house when Ranganadham couple changes his decision. Finally, the movie ends on a happy note with the marriage of Venu and Susheela.

Cast
N. T. Rama Rao as Venu
Jamuna as Susheela
Jaggayya as Vasu
Gummadi as Justice Ranganatham
Mikkilineni as Veerayya
Ramana Reddy as Venkataswamy Senior
Padmanabham as Venkataswamy Junior
Raja Babu as Dorakadu
Balaiah as DSP
త్యాగరాజు (నటుడు)
Jagga Rao
Boddapati as Setti
Geetanjali as Rani
Hemalatha as Shantamma
Sandhya
P. Lakshmikanthamma as Suramma

Soundtrack

Music composed by S. Rajeswara Rao & T. Chalapathi Rao. Music released H.M.V. Audio Company.

References

External links
 

Indian drama films
Films scored by S. Rajeswara Rao
Films scored by T. Chalapathi Rao
Films directed by Kotayya Pratyagatma